Eric Pinkins (born August 7, 1991) is a former American football linebacker and safety. He was drafted by the Seattle Seahawks in the sixth round of the 2014 NFL Draft. He played college football at San Diego State.

Early years
Pinkins attended Inderkum High School in Sacramento, California. He was selected to the 2008 all-Metro football defense second-team in high school. Pinkins was named as an all-San Joaquin honorable mention by the National Football Foundation. He recorded 52 tackles, three interceptions, nine pass deflections, four blocked punts, and a fumble recovery in his Junior season of high school. He registered 63 tackles, two interceptions, and 12 pass deflections in his senior season of high school. He was a member of his high school track and field team.

College career
He finished his college football career with a total of 172 tackles, three sacks, two forced fumbles, and 10 pass deflections.

Professional career

Seattle Seahawks
On May 10, 2014, Pinkins was selected by the Seattle Seahawks in the sixth round of the 2014 NFL Draft. On September 5, 2015, he was waived. On September 6, 2015, he was signed to the Seahawks' practice squad. On September 22, 2015, Pinkins was released from the practice squad. On October 14, 2015, he was signed to the practice squad. On November 21, 2015, he was promoted to the active roster. On September 3, 2016, he was waived/injured by the Seahawks and placed on injured reserve. On September 10, he was released from the Seahawks' injured reserve.

New York Giants
On October 12, 2016, Pinkins was signed to the New York Giants practice squad. On November 29, 2016, he was promoted to the active roster.

On September 1, 2017, Pinkins was waived by the Giants.

Dallas Cowboys
After spending the entire 2017 NFL season as a free agent, On May 29, 2018, Pinkins signed with Dallas Cowboys. He was released on September 1, 2018.

San Diego Fleet
In 2019, Pinkins joined the San Diego Fleet. He was one of seven San Diego State alumni to make the team's final 52-man roster. The league ceased operations in April 2019.

Los Angeles Wildcats
In October 2019, Pinkins was selected by the Los Angeles Wildcats in the 2020 XFL Draft. He was waived during final roster cuts on January 22, 2020. He signed to the XFL's Team 9 practice squad during the regular season. He had his contract terminated when the league suspended operations on April 10, 2020.

References

External links
 San Diego State Aztecs football bio
 Seattle Seahawks bio

1991 births
Living people
American football safeties
San Diego State Aztecs football players
Seattle Seahawks players
New York Giants players
Players of American football from Sacramento, California
Dallas Cowboys players
San Diego Fleet players
Los Angeles Wildcats (XFL) players
Team 9 players